Charles Derek Ross (1924 – 1986) was an English historian of the Late Middle Ages. He was educated at Wakefield Grammar School and Brasenose College, Oxford, where he completed a doctoral thesis on the baronage in Yorkshire in the early fifteenth century under the supervision of K.B. McFarlane. He published predominantly on the history of the later medieval English nobility, royalty, and the Wars of the Roses. Originally teaching alongside Margaret Sharp (daughter of T.F. Tout), he became reader and then Professor of Medieval History at the University of Bristol. His pupils included Michael Hicks, Anne Crawford and Ralph Griffiths. He remained at Bristol until his death in 1986, when he was killed by an intruder in his own home.

Ross's best-known works are his biographies of Edward IV and Richard III in the Yale English Monarchs series. These influential books were the first modern comprehensive studies of the Yorkist kings' politics, retinues and landownership.

Bibliography

'Materials for the Study of Baronial Incomes in Fifteenth-Century England,' Economic History Review, NS, vol.6 no. 2 (1953) (with T.B. Pugh)
'The Estates and Finances of Richard Beauchamp, Earl of Warwick,' Dugdale Society Occasional papers No. 12 (1956)
Fifteenth Century England, 1399-1509: Studies in Politics and Society, Manchester 1972 (with Stanley Chrimes and Ralph Griffiths)
Edward IV (1974) 
The Wars of the Roses: A Concise History (1976) 
Richard III (1981)

References

1924 births
1986 deaths
English murder victims
20th-century English historians
Alumni of Brasenose College, Oxford